The 1950 Cork Junior Hurling Championship was the 53rd staging of the Cork Junior Hurling Championship since its establishment by the Cork County Board.

On 3 December 1950, Glen Rovers won the championship following a 4-06 to 3-00 defeat of Ballyhea in the final at the Bishop Casey Memorial Park in Mallow. This was their second championship title overall and a first title in 26 years.

Results

Final

References

Cork Junior Hurling Championship
Cork Junior Hurling Championship